Pelly may refer to:

Places

Canada

Pelly, Saskatchewan
Fort Pelly, a former Hudson's Bay Company fur trading post
Pelly (Saskatchewan electoral district)
Pelly Island, in the Beaufort Sea
Pelly Peak, a mountain in British Columbia 
Pelly River, in Yukon

United States
 Pelly, Texas, now merged into Baytown

People
Pelly (surname)
Pelly Ruddock Mpanzu (born 1993), English footballer
Pelly baronets, a title in the Baronetage of the United Kingdom

See also

Kpelle (disambiguation)
Pel (disambiguation)
Pell (disambiguation)
Pelley, a surname
Pelli, a surname
Pellyton, Kentucky, U.S.